The 2016 Idaho Democratic presidential caucuses took place on March 22 in the U.S. state of Idaho as one of the Democratic Party's primaries ahead of the 2016 presidential election.

Voters convened in each of Idaho's 44 counties at 7 p.m. Mountain Standard Time/6 p.m Pacific Standard Time to proportionally allocate the state's 27 delegates to the Democratic National Convention in Philadelphia in July.

Campaigning
Both major candidates made efforts to either send surrogates or campaign themselves in Idaho before the caucuses took place. On March 17, Olympian Michelle Kwan campaigned for Hillary Clinton at Boise State University, where she spoke to about 150 supporters. On March 18, Bernie Sanders spoke at a local high school in Idaho Falls, Idaho drawing approximately 3,200 supporters. On March 21, the day before the Democratic caucuses, Senator Bernie Sanders spoke to approximately 7,000 supporters at the Taco Bell Arena on the campus of Boise State University.

Aftermath
The caucus was later regarded as having prepared the ground for the Paulette Jordan gubernatorial campaign two years later, inasmuch as it demonstrated the popularity of progressive policy proposals amongst the Idahoan left.

Opinion polling

Results

Gallery

Analysis
Sanders won Idaho by a four-to-one margin over Hillary Clinton, a similarly large landslide win that Barack Obama had enjoyed over Clinton in the Idaho caucuses eight years prior. In a majority white, rural, and ideologically libertarian electorate, Sanders had the upper hand. He won all counties but one on election day, carrying the major cities of Boise in Ada County, Pocatello in Bannock County, and Idaho Falls in Bonneville County. He was also bolstered by rural support from Southern Idaho to the Northern Panhandle, and in Central Idaho including Treasure Valley. Such regions are among the most remote and radically conservative areas of the country.

The Ada County caucus, held at CenturyLink Arena, which was the largest caucus in U.S. history, easily broke the 2008 record, with many voters waiting in line for three or four hours in brisk wind chill. The mile-long line stretched for several city blocks; more than 9,100 voters participated in what was called a "massive" turnout, especially given Idaho's status as a Republican stronghold.

Sanders won 78.0% of the vote statewide; only his home state of Vermont, Alaska, and Utah have given him a wider margin of victory.

References

Idaho
Democratic primary
2016